The National Association of British Schools in Spain (NABSS) is an association and international accrediting body of British independent schools operating in Spain which also has an affiliation with the British Council in Spain.
The Association was founded in 1978 and membership is limited to those schools accredited by the British Council, but most British schools in Spain are members.

NABSS schools offer a range of British qualifications to students, including GCSEs, AS and A Levels and offers professional development for teachers.

List of NABSS schools
Member schools include:
 Almuñecar International School
 Aloha College
 British School of Barcelona
 British School of Tenerife
 Cambridge House Community College
 Canterbury School (Gran Canaria)
 Caxton College
 Kensington School
 Kings College, Madrid
 Lady Elizabeth School
 Runnymede College
 Sage College
 Wingate School

References

External links
NABSS official site
British Council page on NABSS

Associations of schools

Private and independent school organizations
1978 establishments in Spain
Organizations established in 1978